Fabrice Colas (born 21 July 1964) is a retired French track cyclist who competed at the 1984 Summer Olympics in Los Angeles, winning a bronze medal in the 1000 metres time trial. He also competed at the 1988 Summer Olympics. Colas also won silver medal in the professional sprint and bronze in the keirin at the 1991 UCI Track Cycling World Championships.

References

External links
Profile at DatabaseOlympics.com
1000m Time Trial at Full Olympians

1964 births
Living people
French male cyclists
Cyclists at the 1984 Summer Olympics
Cyclists at the 1988 Summer Olympics
Olympic cyclists of France
Olympic medalists in cycling
People from Rueil-Malmaison
Medalists at the 1984 Summer Olympics
Olympic bronze medalists for France